The World Won't End is the second studio album by American indie rock band Pernice Brothers. It was released by Ashmont Records on June 19, 2001. It peaked at number 26 on the UK Independent Albums Chart.

Track listing

Personnel
Credits adapted from liner notes.

Pernice Brothers
 Joe Pernice – vocals, guitar, bass guitar
 Thom Monahan – vocals, guitar, bass guitar, keyboards, drum programming
 Mike Belitsky – drums, percussion
 Laura Stein – vocals, piano, keyboards
 Peyton Pinkerton – vocals, guitar, percussion
 Bob Pernice – vocals, guitar

Additional musicians
 Jeremy Smith – percussion
 Mike Daly – guitar, pedal steel guitar, baritone guitar, mandocello
 Jeffrey Underhill – guitar
 Joe Harvard – guitar
 Ann Viebig – vocals
 Jane Scarpantoni – cello
 Antoine Silverman – violin
 Lorenza Ponce – violin
 David Gold – viola

Technical personnel
 Thom Monahan – production, recording, engineering, mixing
 Joe Pernice – production
 Joe Harvard – additional engineering
 José Ayerve – additional engineering
 Mark Allan Miller – mixing
 Jeff Lipton – mastering
 David Trenholm – string arrangement
 Laura Stein – design
 Adam Woolfit – cover photography
 Norm Demoura – band photography

Charts

References

External links
 
 

2001 albums
Pernice Brothers albums
Albums produced by Thom Monahan